Svobodnensky District  is an administrative and municipal district (raion), one of the twenty in Amur Oblast, Russia. Its administrative center is the town of Svobodny (which is not administratively a part of the district). Population:  14,568 (2002 Census);

Administrative and municipal status
Within the framework of administrative divisions, Svobodnensky District is one of the twenty in the oblast. The town of Svobodny serves as its administrative center, despite being incorporated separately as an urban okrug—an administrative unit with the status equal to that of the districts.

As a municipal division, the district is incorporated as Svobodnensky Municipal District. Svobodny Urban Okrug is incorporated separately from the district.

References

Notes

Sources

Districts of Amur Oblast
 
